Thawon Watthana is a tambon (subdistrict) of Sai Thong Watthana District, in Kamphaeng Phet Province, Thailand. In 2019 it had a total population of 6,632 people.

History
The subdistrict was created effective August 1, 1984 by splitting off 8 administrative villages from Wang Khaem.

Administration

Central administration
The tambon is subdivided into 10 administrative villages (muban).

Local administration
The whole area of the subdistrict is covered by the subdistrict administrative organization (SAO) Thawon Watthana (องค์การบริหารส่วนตำบลถาวรวัฒนา).

References

External links
Thaitambon.com on Thawon Watthana
Thawon Watthana subdistrict administrative organization

Tambon of Kamphaeng Phet Province
Populated places in Kamphaeng Phet province